is the eighth single by Japanese singer/songwriter Mari Hamada, from the greatest hits album Heart and Soul: The Singles. Written by Hamada and Hiroyuki Ohtsuki, the single was released by Invitation on September 7, 1988. The song was used by NHK for their coverage of the 1988 Summer Olympics in Seoul, South Korea. The B-side is "My Tears", a power ballad that has since become one of Hamada's most popular songs.

The single peaked at No. 7 on Oricon's singles chart, making it her first top-10 hit.

Track listing

Chart positions

References

External links 
 
 

1988 singles
1988 songs
Japanese-language songs
Mari Hamada songs
Olympic theme songs
Victor Entertainment singles